William John Ronan (November 8, 1912 – October 15, 2014) was an American public servant and academic who founded and served as the first chairman of New York City's Metropolitan Transportation Authority, from 1968 to 1974. He subsequently served as chairman of the Port Authority of New York and New Jersey from 1974 until 1977 and remained on the board of the Port Authority until 1990. Prior to entering state government as a key aide to Governor Nelson Rockefeller of New York in 1958, he was a professor of government at New York University and served as dean of NYU's graduate school of public service from 1953 to 1958.

Education
Ronan graduated from Syracuse University in 1934, and earned a doctoral degree from New York University in international law and diplomacy. He became dean at NYU and helped establish the Wagner School of Public Service from 1953 to 1958.

Career
Ronan helped found the Tri-State Transportation Commission.  In 1965, he was appointed the first Chairman of the Metropolitan Commuter Transportation Authority by Governor Nelson Rockefeller. The newly formed MCTA purchased the Long Island Rail Road from the Pennsylvania Railroad.

On February 29, 1968, the MCTA published a 56-page report for Governor Rockefeller, and in it, proposed several subway and railroad improvements under the name "Metropolitan Transportation, a Program for Action". Chairman Ronan pushed for the MTA to pursue the Program for Action, saying, "We're making up for 30 years of do-nothingism". The next day, the MCTA dropped the word "Commuter" from its name and became the Metropolitan Transportation Authority (MTA). The MTA took over the operations of the other New York City-area transit systems and Ronan became chairman of the MTA.

During Ronan's tenure, the MTA oversaw the construction of three lines as part of the Program for Action: the 63rd Street Line, part of the Second Avenue Subway, and, the Archer Avenue Line. The MTA also shut down the Third Avenue elevated line in the Bronx.

Later life
After stepping down from the Port Authority, Ronan left public life, retiring to Florida, became a widower after his wife of 57 years, the former Elena Vinadé, died in 1996. He died of natural causes at his house in West Palm Beach, Florida, on October 15, 2014, at the age of 101.

See also
 Howard S. Cullman
 Austin Tobin
 Christopher O. Ward

References

1912 births
2014 deaths
New York University faculty
American centenarians
Men centenarians
Syracuse University alumni
New York University School of Law alumni
Executives of Metropolitan Transportation Authority (New York)
Chairmen of the Port Authority of New York and New Jersey